The Chief of the General Staff of the Moldovan National Army (Marelui Stat Major al Armatei Republicii Moldova) also known as the Commander of National Army is the professional head of the Moldovan National Army and the larger Armed Forces of the Republic of Moldova. The position was established on 26 April 1994, two days after the general staff of the national army was established.

The purpose of the Chief of the General Staff is to assist the Minister of Defense and the President of Moldova in commanding the Moldovan National Army. The Chief of the General Staff is also the superior to the Commander of the Moldovan Ground Forces and the Commander of the Moldovan Air Force. During wartime, the Chief of the General Staff becomes the First Deputy Supreme Commander-in-Chief of the Armed Forces should the Minister of Defense be a civilian.

List of Chiefs

Related Articles
Armed Forces of the Republic of Moldova
Ministry of Defense (Moldova)
Moldovan Air Force
Moldovan Ground Forces

References

Military of Moldova
Moldova